Liubov Kostiukova is a Ukrainian chess player who holds the titles of International Master (IM) and Woman Grandmaster, both obtained in 2006.

In July 2006, when her rating peaked at 2409, she was ranked 47th in the world for women chess players.

References

External links 
 

1983 births
Living people
Chess International Masters
Chess woman grandmasters
Ukrainian chess players